Henry MacCormac is the name of:
Henry MacCormac (physician) (1800–1886), British physician in Belfast
Henry MacCormac (dermatologist) (1879–1950), his grandson, dermatologist